Hayes Hamilton Davenport (born March 23, 1986) is an American writer, comedian, television producer, podcast host, and activist. He is best known, along with Sean Clements, as one half of The Boys, the duo who hosts the podcast Hollywood Handbook.

Early life
Davenport grew up in Wellesley, Massachusetts. He participated on his high school's rowing team.

Davenport attended Harvard University, where he graduated with a degree in social studies. He was the editor of the Harvard Lampoon. After graduating, he moved to Los Angeles.

Davenport has also appeared as a contestant on the game show Jeopardy!.

Career
Davenport briefly worked at the Game Show Network before being signed by Creative Artists Agency.

He has written for Big Lake, Family Guy, Great News, Eastbound & Down, Allen Gregory, Divorce, and Nick Swardson's Pretend Time. He was a writer for the show Vice Principals.
Davenport also acts occasionally and has starred in the web series Those People.

Davenport is the host of multiple podcasts, including Hollywood Handbook and The Flagrant Ones. From March 2018 to July 2021, he also co-hosted the LA Podcast, together with Scott Frazier and Alisa Walker.

Davenport appeared as a guest on The Big Alakens Big Lake marathon fundraiser episode of The George Lucas Talk Show.

Activism
In addition to his career, Davenport is a homelessness activist, helping and advocating for people experiencing homelessness. He is on the board of directors of the SELAH Neighborhood Homeless Coalition, a Los Angeles–based non-profit organization he has been volunteering with since 2017, and worked full-time on Nithya Raman's successful 2020 campaign for Los Angeles City Council. Raman is one of the co-founders of SELAH and made the issue of homelessness central to her campaign. After volunteering on the campaign, Davenport cited starting to formally work as a consultant for Raman on homelessness and housing projects as the reason for departing as a host of the LA Podcast in July 2021. He has talked extensively about housing and homelessness in Los Angeles on his own LA Podcast as well as other podcasts, such as Gimme Shelter: The California Housing Crisis Pod and High and Mighty.

References

External links
Hollywood Handbook

1986 births
Living people
Male actors from California
American male comedians
American comics writers
American male television actors
American television producers
American television writers
American male television writers
Comedians from California
The Harvard Lampoon alumni
21st-century American comedians
21st-century American screenwriters
21st-century American male writers
Homelessness activists